On the evening of 23 December 2022, a private house operating as an unauthorized nursing home caught fire in Kemerovo, Russia, killing 22 people and injuring six.

Background 
In 2021, the Ministry of Emergency Situations proposed introducing a special registry for nursing homes and hospices after a series of fires in Saint Petersburg, Moscow, Krasnogorsk, Moscow Oblast, the village of Ishbuldino in Bashkortostan, and the village of Borovsky, Tyumen Oblast.

In January, the boarding house "Golden Age" burned down in Kemerovo, killing four people.

Fire 
The fire occurred on the evening of 23 December on Tavricheskaya Street in Kemerovo, covering an area of  The fire was rated as 'increased difficulty.'

TASS, citing emergency services, wrote that the cause of the fire could be a malfunctioning furnace. "A private residential building was adapted for the elderly. There was stove heating. According to preliminary data, it was the improper operation of the stove that caused the fire," the source said. According to an Interfax source however, the cause of the fire could be a malfunction of an electric heater or wiring.

RIA Novosti writes that the fire was extinguished by 23:15 local time.

Casualties 
Initially, four people were reported killed and two injured. The Ministry of Emergency Situations later announced that six people had died. TASS, citing emergency services, increased the count first to nine victims, and then later 11.

As of 23 December, 20 people are confirmed dead.

Aftermath 
Kemerovo Oblast Governor Sergey Tsivilyov announced all nursing homes in the city, particularly unregistered ones, to be checked by the emergency services. The Investigative Committee of Russia has opened a criminal case after the fire in Kemerovo. An evangelical priest, suspected with running the care home was detained.

See also
2018 Kemerovo fire

References 

2022 disasters in Russia
2022 fires in Asia
Fires in Russia
2022
December 2022 events in Russia
Residential building fires
Nursing homes